Ismaël Sow (born 19 February 2001) is a French professional footballer who plays as a right-back for Championnat National 3 club Bordeaux B.

Personal life 
Born in France, Sow is of Senegalese descent.

References 

2001 births
Living people
Sportspeople from Tarbes
French footballers
French sportspeople of Senegalese descent
Black French sportspeople
Association football fullbacks
FC Girondins de Bordeaux players
Royal Excel Mouscron players
Championnat National 3 players
Championnat National 2 players
Challenger Pro League players
French expatriate footballers
Expatriate footballers in Belgium
French expatriate sportspeople in Belgium
Footballers from Occitania (administrative region)